Myles Alan Chefetz (born November 5, 1958) is an American restaurateur and chief executive officer of Myles Restaurant Group. He has been twice nominated for the James Beard Foundation "Outstanding Restaurateur" Award and has been referred to as the "Sultan of South of Fifth." 

Chefetz is considered a visionary in the industry, and according to Ocean Drive Magazine, "His concepts have gone global, with his versions of mac and cheese, creamed spinach, tuna tartare, and other menu items popping up in steakhouses worldwide." Prime 112, Chefetz's chef-driven steakhouse, is consistently ranked in the top ten highest-grossing restaurants in the United States. The restaurant is known for its high-end and celebrity clientele with regular guests, including Dwyane Wade Gabrielle Union, Dwayne "The Rock" Johnson, and the Kardashians.

Early life and education
Chefetz was born on the Homestead Air Reserve Base in Miami, Florida to parents Dr. Marshall Chefetz and Jean Wyman. He, his older brother Gary, and younger sister Karen grew up in Allentown, Pennsylvania and Springfield, New Jersey. Chefetz attended Jonathan Dayton High School before graduating from George Washington University with a degree in political science. Chefetz earned a J.D. from the University of Miami in 1984.

Career
After finishing law school, Chefetz moved to New York City, where he started his own real estate law practice. Chefetz became personal lawyer to Mark Fleischman, former owner of the iconic nightclub, Studio 54. It was during his time with Fleischman that Chefetz got his first introduction to the supper club business. Chefetz handled the lease negotiations for the property as well as contracts with club promoters, and even began promoting parties himself. By age 30 Chefetz left his law practice and opened Country Club, a  nightclub on 86th Street in the Upper East Side.

During a 1994 vacation to Miami, Chefetz found himself disappointed with the dining scene in South Beach. Seeing a real need for chef-driven, rather than promoter-driven, restaurants, he opened Nemo in 1995. Nemo was an instant success, so Chefetz sold his properties in New York and moved to Miami full-time. Chefetz continued to innovate and reshape the South Beach dining scene, opening the modern diner Big Pink in 1996; the diner has now become a South Beach landmark. In 2004 Chefetz opened Prime 112 in the historic Browns Hotel.

Chefetz has parlayed his successful restaurant endeavors into numerous real estate ventures. In 2013, he sold his penthouse at South Beach's Ocean House to Marc J. Leder for $15 million ($3,592 per square foot) in an all-cash deal.

Chefetz and his longtime girlfriend Natasha have one daughter, Mylie Danielle Chefetz.

Restaurants and hotel
Miami Beach:
Big Pink – opened December 1996
Prime One Twelve – opened January 2004
Prime Italian – opened December 2008
Prime Hotel – opened January 2010
Prime Fish – opened February 2014
Prime Private – opened early 2019, 200-seat capacity

Closed:
Nemo – January 1995 
Shoji

Charitable involvement
Prime 112 is closely involved with the Mourning Family Foundation, a Miami-based non-profit founded by former NBA player Alonzo Mourning and his wife Tracy.

References

External links 
 

1950 births
Living people
American businesspeople
Jonathan Dayton High School alumni
People from Allentown, Pennsylvania
People from Miami Beach, Florida
People from Springfield Township, Union County, New Jersey
University of Miami School of Law alumni